Andrew Gregg Homestead, also known as the Bernard P. Taylor Residence, is a historic home located at Potter Township, Centre County, Pennsylvania. It was built about 1825, and is a two-story, "L"-shaped, limestone dwelling with a gable roof.  At the rear is a one-story frame summer kitchen with a loft and dining room.  The interior has a traditional Georgian center hall plan.  The house was built by Andrew Gregg, Jr., son of Congressman Andrew Gregg (1755–1835).

It was added to the National Register of Historic Places in 1977.

References

Houses on the National Register of Historic Places in Pennsylvania
Houses completed in 1825
Houses in Centre County, Pennsylvania
National Register of Historic Places in Centre County, Pennsylvania